The 2019 Southern Conference men's soccer tournament was the 32nd edition of the Southern Conference Men's Soccer Tournament. The tournament decided the Southern Conference champion as well as the conference's automatic berth into the 2019 NCAA Division I men's soccer tournament. The tournament began on November 9 and concluded on November 16, 2019.

Mercer defeated UNCG in the championship match, giving the program their fourth ever SoCon title.

Seeds

Bracket

Bracket

Results

First round

Quarterfinals

Semifinals

Final

Top goalscorers
2 Goals
  Kyle Barks – Belmont
  Jordan Dozzi – Belmont
  Trevor Martineau – Mercer
  Albert Pedra – UNCG

1 Goal

  Micah Albert – UNCG
  Roberto Arteaga – Mercer
  Niccolo Dagnoni – Belmont
  Dylan Gaither – Mercer
  Miles Fenton – Furman
  Michael Ille – Mercer
  Brett Royster – Belmont
  Jack Shaw – Belmont
  Conor Sloan – Furman
  Leo Toledo Jr. – Mercer
  Pablo Martin Virgilo – Belmont

SoCon Tournament Best XI 

MVP in Bold

References

External links 
 SoCon Men's Soccer Tournament

2019
November 2019 sports events in the United States
2019 in sports in North Carolina
2019 in sports in South Carolina
2019 in sports in Tennessee